The Lynn Redgrave Theater was an Off-Broadway theater located in New York City, New York, that was previously known as  the Bleecker Street Theater and 45 Bleecker Street Theater, the theater name was changed in 2013.

The theatre is named after actress Lynn Redgrave.

References

External links

Off-Broadway theaters
Theatres in Manhattan